House of Demons is a 2018 American horror film directed and written by Patrick Meaney that follows four estranged friends who reunite to spend the weekend at a remote house that was once home to a Manson Family like cult. It stars Amber Benson, Kaytlin Borgen, Morgan Peter Brown, Taliesin Jaffe, Tiffany Smith, Jeff Torres, Whitney Moore and Dove Meir. The film was released on February 6, 2018 by Smith Global Media and Sony Home Entertainment.

Plot
Gwen, Matthew, Katrina, and Spencer were best friends for years, until a terrible tragedy tore them apart, and left all of them in a state of arrested development.  Years later, they’re reunited for a destination wedding to stay together in a rented house. What they don’t know is in the late 60s, the house was home to a Manson Family-like cult, run by Frazer, a charismatic former scientist pushing the boundaries of human consciousness.  His experiments echo through time and manifest everyone’s darkest fears and memories before them as time blurs and Frazer’s cult and the present day collide. Over the course of one long night, everyone must confront their darkness or be destroyed by it.

Cast
Kaytlin Borgen as Gwen
Morgan Peter Brown as Spencer
Dove Meir as Frazer
Whitney Moore as Katrina
Tiffany Smith as Samantha
Jeff Torres as Matthew
Amber Benson as Maya
Chloe Dykstra as Nancy
Taliesin Jaffe as Dave
Brian Townes as Derek
Jeff Berg as Jeff
Paradox Pollack as The Demon
Alexia Dox as Dawn

Production

The film was shot in 13 days, primarily in Santa Clarita, California. Meaney chose to cast many people who are prominent in the geek world, after developing those connections while producing documentaries about the world of comic books.

The film was originally called Trip House, but the title was subsequently changed to House of Demons.

Release

The film was acquired for distribution by Smith Global Media and Sony Home Entertainment. It was released February 6, 2018 on DVD, VOD and digital.

In advance of the release, the film received positive reviews from Aint It Cool News, We The Nerdy, Unseen Films and other outlets.

References

External links
 
 

2018 horror films
American supernatural horror films
Demons in film
2010s English-language films
2010s American films